Statistics of League of Ireland in the 1961/1962 season.

Overview
It was contested by 12 teams, and Shelbourne won the championship after beating Cork Celtic 1-0 in a Championship Play-off on 2 May 1962 at Dalymount Park.

Shelbourne qualified to play in the European Cup, Shamrock Rovers qualified to play in the Cup Winners' Cup and Drumcondra qualified to play in the Fairs Cup for next season.

Final classification

Results

Top scorers

League of Ireland seasons
Ireland
1961–62 in Republic of Ireland association football